Machulishche is a village in Belarus. It is located in the Kamenets District, Brest Region, 338 km south-west of the capital Minsk and near the Polish border.

External links 
 
 Location including the places

Villages in Belarus
Populated places in Brest Region
Grodno Governorate
Polesie Voivodeship